Long Tap is a Kenyah settlement in the Miri division of Sarawak, Malaysia.

It is located on the Akah River, a tributary of the Baram River, about 10 km upstream from the confluence at Long Akah.

Neighbouring settlements include:

References

Populated places in Sarawak